The Săruri is a small river in Constanța County, Romania. Near the village Sinoe it flows into Lake Sinoe, a lagoon of the Black Sea.

References

Rivers of Constanța County
Rivers of Romania
0Săruri